Boston's High Spine is an architectural planning design that arose in 1961, designed by the Committee of Civic Design, part of the Boston Society of Architects.  The basic idea of the High Spine is to create a string of skyscrapers that runs from Massachusetts Avenue to downtown, between Boylston Street on the north and Huntington Avenue and Columbus Avenue on the south. This path follows part of the Massachusetts Turnpike that was extended along the Boston and Albany Railroad tracks and includes some former rail yards. Development here avoided disruption of pre-existing, historical communities and gave the city a distinctive skyline that acts as a visual reference for one's location within the city.

Buildings of the High Spine 
Two peaks of the High Spine, the John Hancock Tower and the Prudential Tower are found in Boston's Back Bay between Massachusetts Avenue and Arlington Street. Others include 111 Huntington Avenue, 500 Boylston Street and the Berkeley Building, which are all visible from outside the city.

Skyscrapers in Boston